Stephen Roy Stevens (5 February 1903 – 22 June 1990) was an Australian rules footballer who played with St Kilda in the Victorian Football League (VFL).

Notes

External links 

Australian rules footballers from Victoria (Australia)
St Kilda Football Club players
1903 births
1990 deaths